"Teso Dos Bichos" is the eighteenth episode of the third season of the science fiction television series The X-Files. It premiered on the Fox network on March 8, 1996. It was written by John Shiban, and directed by Kim Manners. The episode is a "Monster-of-the-Week" story, unconnected to the series' wider mythology. "Teso Dos Bichos" earned a Nielsen household rating of 10.7, being watched by 17.38 million people in its initial broadcast. The episode received mostly negative reviews.

The show centers on FBI special agents Fox Mulder (David Duchovny) and Dana Scully (Gillian Anderson) who work on cases linked to the paranormal, called X-Files. In this episode, Mulder and Scully investigate a series of deaths that occur immediately after an ancient artifact is brought to Boston from an excavation site in South America. According to Scully, the deaths appear to be the result of political terrorism, but Mulder suspects something more improbable.

The production for "Teso Dos Bichos", which was strongly disliked by the cast and crew of The X-Files, was plagued by several issues. Director Kim Manners, who had particular disdain for the episode, later made T-shirts and gave them to the cast and crew that read "'Teso Dos Bichos' Survivor". The episode's title translates from archaic Portuguese into English as "Burial Mound of Small Animals," although other translations have been proposed.

Plot

At an archaeological dig in the Ecuadorian highlands, two archaeologists, Dr. Bilac and Dr. Roosevelt, get into an argument over the removal of a burial urn that contains an Amaru, or a female shaman. Roosevelt argues that the urn must be taken from the site and preserved in a museum, much to the chagrin of Bilac and the tribespeople present. Later, a native shaman distributes Yaje to the local villagers and Bilac. During this ritual, a jaguar spirit kills Roosevelt in his tent.

Later, in Boston, Fox Mulder and Dana Scully investigate the disappearance of Dr. Craig Horning, an archaeologist from a local history museum, after a security guard discovers a large amount of blood in Horning's lab. They interview both the curator, Dr. Lewton, and graduate student Mona Wustner. They also visit a reclusive Bilac. After closing, Lewton is killed by the jaguar spirit after his car doesn't start. During an investigation of the crime scene, Scully comes across rat corpses in the engine compartment of Lewton's vehicle. Mona denies that anything unusual has happened in the museum.

Mulder and a group of police search for Lewton's remains. Scully sees blood dripping on Mulder's face from above and, upon looking up, they see a portion of Lewton's intestine hanging from a tree. Scully, about to perform an autopsy on the intestine, is interrupted when Mona suddenly calls and reports that Bilac was under the influence of Yaje. At the museum, Mona hears noises from a restroom and, upon opening a toilet lid, she sees rats forcing their way out of the sewer. When the two agents arrive, they discover Bilac crying beside one of the toilets, saying that Mona is dead.

Later, Bilac escapes from the room in which he is being held without exiting through the only door. Mulder notices a large drag mark through the dust on the floor, discovering a hatch leading to the museum's old steam tunnels. While exploring the tunnels, the agents find the remains of the victims and are attacked by a multitude of feral cats. As they try to escape, they come across Bilac's mutilated body. The two agents make their way out and close the hatch on the pursuing cats. The episode closes with Mulder suspecting that the animal attacks were associated with the burial urn that had been removed against the wishes of the Ecuadorian tribespeople; it is shortly returned to the burial grounds, where the local shaman watches the urn's reburial with jaguar-like eyes.

Production
"Teso Dos Bichos" was written by John Shiban, who claims to have derived the episode's title from an ancient chant. The words translate into Galician-Portuguese as "Burial Mound of Small Animals," although other translations have been proposed. Unbeknownst to Shiban, in parts of Colombia and Venezuela, the word "bichos" is a euphemism for testicles; Shiban later joked that this "controversy" would be "good for ratings".

The production of the episode was plagued with issues. At the last minute the ending of the episode had to be rewritten; originally, the episode was to feature "hordes" of common house cats attacking Mulder and Scully, but the cats refused to attack under direction, doing "pretty much nothing". To further complicate matters, Gillian Anderson had a severe cat allergy, and so the whole sequence was nixed. While director Kim Manners felt that the episode's first three acts were "the best three acts of television [he had] ever directed", he believed that the fourth act was "an absolute disaster." Manners reportedly asked series creator Chris Carter to film a leopard for the fourth act rather than house cats, saying "I begged Carter 'Please let's revisit the leopard in the teaser because I'm never going to make these cats scary.'"

"Teso Dos Bichos" was strongly disliked by the cast and crew of The X-Files, including both David Duchovny and Kim Manners. Manners found the story uninteresting because "pussycats are not scary." He later made T-shirts and gave them to the cast and crew that read "Teso Dos Bichos Survivor." The episode earned two distinctive nicknames courtesy of Manners: The first, "Second Salmon," referred to the number of re-writes the episode went through. Every time an episode was re-written, the color of the script changed accordingly; "Teso Dos Bichos" went through so many re-writes that the cast eventually received a second round of salmon colored copies. The second nickname, again, courtesy of Manners, was "Teso Dos Bitches."

Broadcast and reception

"Teso Dos Bichos" premiered on the Fox network on March 8, 1996. This episode earned a Nielsen rating of 10.7, with an 18 share, meaning that roughly 10.7 percent of all television-equipped households, and 18 percent of households watching television, were tuned in to the episode. It was viewed by 17.38 million viewers.

The episode received negative reviews from critics. A writer from Entertainment Weekly gave "Teso Dos Bichos" a C, and sardonically wrote, "No es bueno!" Reviewer Zack Handlen of The A.V. Club gave the episode a C− and criticized the laziness of the writing, saying, "Maybe I'm missing something here. There could be some subtext in, um, yeah, I got nothing. The dead rats in the toilet were freaky, right? And they did kill that dog off, so that's hardcore. Really, though, I'm just too disappointed to say much else. This is paint-by-numbers at its most tedious, and while it's nice to have evident proof of how far the show has come since it started, that doesn't make it any easier to sit through." Critical Myth's John Keegan gave the episode a scathing review, only awarding it 1/10. He criticized the seriousness of the plot and wrote, "Overall, this has to be one of the worst episodes of the series. In nearly every possible way, the episode fails to live up to the usual expectations. Perhaps aware of how silly the whole thing sounds, the cast and crew seem weary of it all from beginning to end. Even some of the bad ideas in the later seasons don’t fall to this level of inadequacy." Cyriaque Lamar from i09 called the Jaguar Spirit one of "The 10 Most Ridiculous X-Files Monsters" and wrote, "In this fairly ridiculous Season 3 episode, an Ecuadorian artifact possessed by a Jaguar Spirit (or something) causes tabbies to go bonkers and murder people. This scene of Scully fighting a cat deserves the GIF treatment. Make it happen, folks!" Robert Shearman and Lars Pearson, in their book Wanting to Believe: A Critical Guide to The X-Files, Millennium & The Lone Gunmen, rated the episode one star out of five, calling the premise "achingly unambitious". The two roundly criticized the plot, calling it a "retread of a cursed mummy movie without a mummy", as well as the performances of Trevino, Duchovny, and Anderson. Despite the overall negativity, Shearman and Pearson noted that the "much derided" cat sequence was not "that badly handled."

Footnotes

Bibliography

External links 

"Teso Dos Bichos" on The X-Files official website
 

1996 American television episodes
Television episodes about curses
Television episodes set in Boston
Television episodes about shamanism
The X-Files (season 3) episodes